Wili, WILI or Willi may refer to:

People
 Heinrich Willi, who described Prader–Willi syndrome
 Herbert Willi (born 1956), Austrian composer
 Wili Jønsson, member of the Danish rock band Gasolin'

Other uses
 WILI (AM), a radio station in Willimantic, Connecticut, United States
 WILI-FM, a radio station (98.3 FM) licensed to Willimantic, Connecticut, United States
 "Wili, Pt. 2" and "Wili, Pt. 3", tracks on the Green Day album Dark Magus
 Wilis, a Slavic folklore feminine spirit that dances men to death
 Wili Co Ltd, a Private company in Viet Nam.

See also
 Harold Lamont Otey (1951–1994) or "Walkin' Wili", the first person executed since 1976 in Nebraska
 Wiliwili (Erythrina sandwicensis), a species of flowering tree in the pea family, Fabaceae
 Wilis (disambiguation)
 Willi, a given name
 Willy (disambiguation)